Badicul Moldovenesc is a village in Cahul District, Moldova, about  to the north of Cahul.

References

Villages of Cahul District
Populated places on the Prut